Chaturangi is a mountain of the Garhwal Himalaya in Uttarakhand India.The elevation of Chaturangi is . It is 102nd highest located entirely within the Uttrakhand. Nanda Devi, is the highest mountain in this category. It is situated in the Gangotri National Park. It lies 3.9 km south of Pilapani Parbat  its nearest higher neighbor. It is 5.1 km SW of Mana Parbat II  and it lies 11.2 km SE of Yogeshwar .

Climbing history
In 1974 A team from kolkata climbed Chaturangi on September 27.The team comprising Jahar Guha Thakurta, Debu P. Bhattacharjee, B.S. Negi and Sherpa Kami. 

In 1980 Toyo University Alpine Club, from Japan led by Kenshiro Ohtaki. The other members in the team Kimimasa Miwa, Mutsuo Ominato, Fumihide Saito, Yoshiharu Ohta and Junichi Endo. On October 18 camp I set up at 15,425 feet. On October 20 They set up Camp II at 16,075 feet below the south ridge of Chaturangi. On October 22 Camp III at 19,000 feet. On October 27 Miwa, Ominato and Ohta starting at seven A.M. in the morning and reached to the summit at three P.M. On October 29, Ohtaki, Saito and Junichi Endo also reached the summit at 1:35 in the afternoon.

Neighboring and subsidiary peaks
Neighboring or subsidiary peaks of Chaturangi:
 Mana Parbat I: 
 Kalindi peak: 
 Pilapani Parbat: 
 Chandra Parbat I: 
 Satopanth:
 Vasuki Parbat: 
 Bhagirathi Parbat III:

Glaciers and rivers
On the southern side lies Chaturangi Glacier which later joins Gangotri Glacier. From the snout of Gangotri Glacier emerges Bhagirathi River one of the main tributaries of river Ganga. At Dev Prayag it merges with Alaknanda River the other main tributaries of river Ganga.and called Ganga there after.

References

Mountains of Uttarakhand
Six-thousanders of the Himalayas
Geography of Chamoli district